Castrum doloris (Latin for castle of grief) is a name for the structure and decorations sheltering or accompanying the catafalque or bier that signify the prestige or high estate of the deceased. A castrum doloris might feature an elaborate baldachin and would include candles, possibly flowers, and in most cases coats of arms, epitaphs and possibly allegorical statues. Many extensive castra doloris can be traced to the customs of 17th century and 18th century or even earlier, since the funeral arrangements of Sigismund II Augustus included a castrum doloris in 1570s.

See also

 Funeral Crown
 coffin portraits: Notable examples includes from the Polish–Lithuanian Commonwealth.

Visual arts genres
Death customs
Latin words and phrases